Wakulla Correctional Institution is a prison located  southeast of Tallahassee, Florida. It is located in Wakulla County, and served by the Crawfordville, Florida post office.

The attached Wakulla Correctional Institution Annex was established in 2008.  It holds another 1,532 inmates at the same security levels.

Wakulla Correctional Institution is the location of the Fallen Officer Memorial of the Florida Department of Corrections. The names of the fallen officers are engraved onto the memorial each year during an annual wreath laying ceremony with a portrait of the fallen placed on the wall inside of the adjacent building.

References

Buildings and structures in Wakulla County, Florida
Prisons in Florida
1996 establishments in Florida